Stevens was an American racing car constructor. Stevens cars competed in seven FIA World Championship races – the – Indianapolis 500s.

World Championship Indianapolis 500 results

Formula One constructors (Indianapolis only)
American racecar constructors